Millicent Wiranto (born 29 May 1993) is an Indonesian badminton player.

Achievements

BWF International Challenge/Series (1 title, 2 runners-up) 
Women's singles

  BWF International Challenge tournament
  BWF International Series tournament
  BWF Future Series tournament

References

External links 
 

1993 births
Living people
Sportspeople from Medan
Indonesian people of Chinese descent
Indonesian female badminton players